Admiral Clinton may refer to:

Edward Clinton, 1st Earl of Lincoln (1512–1584–85), British Royal Navy admiral
George Clinton (Royal Navy officer) (c. 1686–1761), British Royal Navy admiral

See also
Lewis Clinton-Baker (1866–1939), British Royal Navy admiral